Pat Flynn is a guitarist, singer, and songwriter, best known for his tenure with New Grass Revival from 198189.

Career 
Flynn is featured on the Randy Travis album Rise and Shine released in 2001, and on Lee Ann Womack's I Hope You Dance (2000). In addition, Pat wrote and performed on Garth Brooks' hit single Do What You Gotta Do, which was originally performed by New Grass Revival.

Pat is a featured artist on the Nashville Acoustic Sessions CD project, with Raul Malo, Rob Ickes, and Dave Pomeroy on CMH Records. The record ended up on many critics' “best of the year” lists and achieved Top-10 status on the Americana radio chart. Pat is also a featured player on The Greencards CDs, Movin' On and Weather and Water, released on DualTone Records.

In 2004, Flynn released his first solo CD project, entitled reQuest. Appearing with Pat on this project are Béla Fleck, John Cowan, Rob Ickes, Stuart Duncan, Jim Hoke, Buddy Greene, and others.

In 2007, he released his second CD, 'reVision'. Flynn has been featured by cover stories in Flatpicking Guitar and Bluegrass Now magazines, and he was chosen as Tom T Hall's musical director and guitarist for Hall’s  “Artist In Residence” month at The Country Music Hall of Fame in Nashville.

In November and December 2009, Pat toured as lead guitarist in Michael Martin Murphey's Rio Grande Band for Murphey's annual production of Cowboy Christmas.

References

External links
 Official Pat Flynn Website

1952 births
Living people
People from Hollywood, Los Angeles
New Grass Revival members
American bluegrass musicians
American country singer-songwriters
Musicians from Los Angeles
Country musicians from California
Singer-songwriters from California